A magnitude 5.1 earthquake struck India, at depth of 16.1 km (10 mi), near Rudraprayag district in the state of Uttarakhand on February 6, 2017.  Tremors were felt continuously for thirty seconds in national capital Delhi NCR and neighbouring Gurgaon, Punjab and other parts of north India. One person was injured, with panic scenes around the epicenter. Many cracks in buildings were reported.

See also
 List of earthquakes in 2017
 List of earthquakes in India

References

External links

2017 earthquakes
2017 disasters in India
Disasters in Uttarakhand
Earthquakes in India
February 2017 events in India
Rudraprayag